HMS Hampshire was a 50-gun fourth rate ship of the line of the Royal Navy, built at Ipswich by John Barnard to the 1733 proposals of the 1719 Establishment dimensions at Ipswich, and launched on 13 November 1741.

On 29 March 1742 she was under the command of Captain Thomas Limeburner when she captured , a Spanish privateer sloop of 12 guns  and 12 patereros (swivel guns). She had a crew of 140 men, some of whom were English. She was a new vessel, only 14 months old, belonging to San Sebastián, and had taken 21 prizes. The Royal Navy apparently briefly took Galgo into service under her existing name.

In January 1743 Limeburner and Hampshire captured two more privateers, one of the same strength as Galgo. The other was armed with 15 guns and swivels, and had a crew of 124 men.

On 17 October 1760 Hampshire,  and  intercepted five French vessels in the Windward Passage. On 18 October Lively captured the  French 20-gun corvette Valeur. Boreas captured the frigate Sirenne, and Hampshire chased the merchant frigate Prince Edward on shore where her crew set fire to her, leading her to blow up. Prince Edward was armed with 32 guns and had a crew of 180 men under the command of Captain Dubois.

On 19 October, Hampshire, with Lively and Valeur, cornered the King's frigate Fleur de Lis in Freshwater Bay, a little to leeward of Port-de-Paix; her crew too set her on fire. Fleur de Lis was also armed with 32 guns, and had a crew of 190 men under the command of Captain Diguarty. The merchant frigate Duc de Choiseul, of 32 guns and 180 men under the command of Captain Bellevan, escaped into Port-de-Paix. The two merchant frigates carried cargoes of sugar and indigo.

Fate

Hampshire served until being broken up in 1766.

Notes, citations, and references
Notes

Citations

References

Charnock, John (1797) Biographia navalis; or, Impartial memoirs of the lives and characters of officers of the navy of Great Britain, from the year 1660 to the present time; drawn from the most authentic sources, and disposed in a chronological arrangement (1794). (London:R. Faulder).
Lavery, Brian (2003) The Ship of the Line - Volume 1: The development of the battlefleet 1650-1850. Conway Maritime Press. .

Ships of the line of the Royal Navy
1741 ships